The US Human Rights Network (USHRN) is a national network composed of over 200 self-identified grassroots human rights organizations and over 700 individuals working to strengthen what they regard as the protection of human rights in the United States.  The organization seeks "to challenge the pernicious belief that the United States is inherently superior to other countries of the world, and that neither the U.S. government nor the U.S. rights movements have anything to gain from the domestic application of human rights."  Members include organizers, lawyers, policy groups, educators, researchers, and scholars.  The US Human Rights Network is currently headquartered in Atlanta, Georgia.

History 
The network was founded in 2003 by over 50 organizations and individuals as a consequence of the US Human Rights Leadership Summit "Ending Exceptionalism: Strengthening Human Rights in the United States," held in July 2002 at Howard University's Law School. Summit participants discussed six issue areas (Poverty, discrimination, immigration, incarceration, death penalty, and sovereignty), and six sectors of work (education, documentation, organizing, legal, policy, and scholarship). The Network was officially launched on Human Rights Day (December 10) 2003.

Issues 
The US Human Rights Network and its member organizations focus on the following issues:
Affordable Housing 
Criminal Punishment 
Death penalty 
Discrimination
Right to Healthcare 
Immigration 
Economic and Social Rights 
Workers' Rights

References

External links
 US Human Rights Network website

Non-profit organizations based in the United States
Human rights organizations based in the United States
2003 establishments in Georgia (U.S. state)
Organizations based in Atlanta